El Paso County may refer to:

El Paso County, Colorado 
El Paso County, Texas
El Paso County, Kansas Territory